Mie Sørensen (born 21. May 1994) is a Danish handball player who plays for Molde Elite.

References

Danish female handball players
1994 births
Living people
Sportspeople from Aalborg
Viborg HK players